Xavier Ong (Chinese: 王勝宇 / 王胜宇; pinyin: Wang Sheng Yu, born 20 April 1994) is a Singaporean actor.

Early life

Ong was born on 20 April 1994 in Singapore. Step son of Singapore actor Wang Yuqing. He attended Outram Secondary School but did not manage to graduate due to the widely controversial incident in 2010 while he was taking the national 'O' Level examinations.

Career

Early career
Ong's career began soon after he was signed on for guest roles on several local television programs. After a single episode stint on the documentary-drama Crimewatch, he made cameo appearances on several other documentary-drama series. Ong rose to fame with his role as "Alex" in local television drama Don't Stop Believin' (TV series) after which he went on to make more appearances in local television programs and further branched out into film and movies before he was enlisted into the Singapore Armed Forces in late 2012.

2012-2015: Gushcloud Influencer
After achieving mild success with his early work, Ong was enlisted into the army and he wasn't allowed to further appear in television or film for the period of his service. In late 2012, Ong signed on to work with influencer marketing agency Gushcloud International where he started getting engaged in social media campaigns. Ong was involved in several online disputes involving Xiaxue and other Gushcloud influencers. Ong stepped out to apologise for his mistake after receiving backlash following the incident. Ong is said to have terminated his contract with Gushcloud in 2015.

2015-Present: Taiwan and Singapore 
In 2015 after Ong finished serving the nation, he left Gushcloud and ventured into the Taiwan entertainment scene where he made frequent appearances on variety shows but returned to Singapore in late 2015. Ong ended up filming several other television dramas in Singapore with the last being C.L.I.F. 4 and has since returned to Taiwan to further his career.

In January 2017, Ong made his silver screen comeback in the Chinese New Year movie The Fortune Handbook which also stars Christopher Lee, Li Nan Xing, Mark Lee and Vivian Lai. Also in 2017, Ong played "Alfred"; his first role as a Leading Male in  StarHub telemovie Uplift which aired in August 2017 on Starhub ECity.

Filmography

TV Series

Movies

References

1994 births
Living people
Singaporean male television actors
Singaporean male actors